(John) Thomas (Howe) Le Mesurier (18 August 1785 – 29 September 1864) was an Anglican priest in the 19th century.

Le Mesurier was born in Hackney, educated at Brasenose College, Oxford,  became a chaplain to the forces in Malta and was appointed archdeacon of that island in 1834.

Notes

Archdeacons in the Diocese in Europe

People from Hackney Central
1785 births
Alumni of Brasenose College, Oxford
1864 deaths
19th-century Maltese Anglican priests
Archdeacons of Malta